Waasland-Beveren Sinaai Girls is a Belgian women's football club from Klein-Sinaai, Sint-Niklaas. Founded in 1988, Sinaai Girls has played in the Belgian First Division since 1994. Since 2012 it also represents Waasland-Beveren.

Sinaai Girls has been most successful in the Belgian Cup with three titles in a row between 2009 and 2011, the first 3-year winning streak in the competition since 1979. It previously reached the final in 1997 and 2001. Since 2007 the team has ended in the First Division's top five positions, with 2010's 3rd spot being its best historic result.

Titles
 Three Belgian Cups (2009 — 2011)

References

Women's football clubs in Belgium
Association football clubs established in 1988
Sint-Niklaas
1988 establishments in Belgium